Jock Henry Perry (born 20 May 1997) is an Australian professional basketball player for the Casey Cavaliers of NBL1 South. He played college basketball for the Saint Mary's Gaels and the UC Riverside Highlanders.

Early life and career
Perry grew up in Seddon, Victoria and came from a tall family, although his height resulted in breaking 13 different bones. His level of insulin growth hormone was found to be twice that of a normal person's, and a brain scan revealed a tumour on his pituitary gland. A month later, the tumour was removed and found to be benign. Perry was a relative latecomer to basketball, though his height provided an advantage. He arrived at the Australian Institute of Sport Centre of Excellence in 2013, and sustained knee and hand injuries. Perry played against future Saint Mary's teammate Jock Landale once as a teenager, helping to score an upset win. In 2016, Perry signed with the Melbourne Tigers of the South East Australian Basketball League. He committed to play college basketball at Saint Mary's.

College career
Perry redshirted his true freshman season. He played sparingly during his three seasons at Saint Mary's. As a junior, Perry averaged 3.3 points and 2.1 rebounds per game. Following the season, he transferred to UC Riverside as a graduate transfer. On 1 December 2020, Perry scored a career-high 21 points in a 57–42 win against Washington. In the semifinals of the Big West Tournament, he posted 16 points and a career-high 10 rebounds  against UC Irvine. As a senior, Perry averaged 11.5 points and 5.2 rebounds per game. He was named Honorable Mention All-Big West.

Professional career
On 22 April 2021, Perry signed with the Ballarat Miners of the NBL1 South. On 17 August, Perry signed with the Tasmania JackJumpers as a development player for the 2021–22 NBL season.

National team career
Perry has represented Australia in several international tournaments. He played for the U17 team in the 2013 FIBA Oceania Championships, averaging 2.7 points and 2 rebounds per game. Perry was selected as a reserve player in the 2015 FIBA Oceania U19 Championship.  In 2019, he helped Australia win bronze at the Summer Universiade in Italy.

Career statistics

College

|-
| style="text-align:left;"| 2016–17
| style="text-align:left;"| Saint Mary's
| style="text-align:center;" colspan="11"|  Redshirt
|-
| style="text-align:left;"| 2017–18
| style="text-align:left;"| Saint Mary's
| 21 || 0 || 3.2 || .517 || .353 || .727 || .3 || .0 || .0 || .0 || 2.1
|-
| style="text-align:left;"| 2018–19
| style="text-align:left;"| Saint Mary's
| 26 || 0 || 5.3 || .447 || .467 || .714 || 1.2 || .2 || .0 || .1 || 2.1
|-
| style="text-align:left;"| 2019–20
| style="text-align:left;"| Saint Mary's
| 15 || 0 || 7.4 || .588 || .000 || .818 || 2.1 || .4 || .1 || .1 || 3.3
|-
| style="text-align:left;"| 2020–21
| style="text-align:left;"| UC Riverside
| 22 || 22 || 25.6 || .486 || .370 || .821 || 5.2 || 1.1 || .5 || .5 || 11.5
|- class="sortbottom"
| style="text-align:center;" colspan="2"| Career
| 84 || 22 || 10.5 || .494 || .367 || .789 || 2.2 || .4 || .2 || .2 || 4.8

References

External links
UC Riverside Highlanders bio
Saint Mary's Gaels bio

1997 births
Living people
Australian expatriate basketball people in the United States
Australian men's basketball players
Basketball players from Melbourne
Centers (basketball)
Medalists at the 2019 Summer Universiade
People educated at Lake Ginninderra College
Saint Mary's Gaels men's basketball players
UC Riverside Highlanders men's basketball players
Universiade bronze medalists for Australia
Universiade medalists in basketball
People from Seddon, Victoria